Prickly Heat is a reality game show broadcast on Sky One from 11 October 1998 to 11 March 2001.

Transmissions

External links

1998 British television series debuts
2001 British television series endings
London Weekend Television shows
Sky UK original programming
Television series by ITV Studios
English-language television shows